3-Methoxy-4-hydroxyphenylglycol (MHPG, MOPEG) is a metabolite of norepinephrine degradation. In the brain, it is the principal norepinephrine metabolite. It is released into the blood and cerebrospinal fluid, and a blood sample of it may therefore be an indication of recent sympathetic nervous system activity.

Low levels of MHPG in the blood and cerebrospinal fluid are associated with anorexia nervosa and pathological gambling, indicating that norepinephrine may play a role in these behaviors.

References 

O-methylated natural phenols
Phenolic human metabolites
Polyols